Victor Schaefer (2 February 1907 – 16 February 1991) was a South African cricketer. He played in three first-class matches for Border in 1929/30.

See also
 List of Border representative cricketers

References

External links
 

1907 births
1991 deaths
South African cricketers
Border cricketers
Sportspeople from Qonce